Đồng Văn may refer to several places in Vietnam:

Đồng Văn District, a rural district of Hà Giang Province
Đồng Văn Plateau and Dong Van Karst Plateau Geopark located in Hà Giang 
Đồng Văn, Hà Giang, a township and capital of Đồng Văn District

, a ward of Duy Tiên town
, a rural commune of Quế Phong District, Nghệ An Province
, a rural commune of Tân Kỳ District, Nghệ An Province
, a rural commune of Thanh Chương District, Nghệ An Province
, a rural commune of Bình Liêu District
, a rural commune of Yên Lạc District